Al Udeid Air Base is one of two  military bases southwest of Doha, Qatar, also known as Abu Nakhlah Airport. 

It houses the Qatar Emiri Air Force, United States Air Force, Royal Air Force, and other foreign forces. It is host to a forward headquarters of United States Central Command, headquarters of the United States Air Forces Central Command, No. 83 Expeditionary Air Group RAF, and the 379th Air Expeditionary Wing of the USAF. 

In 1999, the then Emir of Qatar, Sheikh Hamad, told U.S. officials that he would like to see as many as 10,000 U.S. servicemen permanently stationed at Al Udeid. According to media reports in June 2017, the base hosted over 11,000 U.S. and U.S.-led anti-ISIL coalition forces and over 100 operational aircraft.

It is the largest U.S. military base in the Middle East.

History

United States Air Force
Following joint military operations during Operation Desert Storm in 1991, Qatar and the United States concluded a Defense Cooperation Agreement that has been subsequently expanded. In 1996, Qatar built Al Udeid Air Base at the cost of more than $1 billion. The U.S. first used the then-secret base in late September 2001, when the Air Force needed to get aircraft in position for its operations in Afghanistan. The U.S. has nearly 40,000 military personnel in the Middle East. The U.S. Fifth Fleet is in Bahrain and has 28,000 military personnel in Kuwait, Bahrain and Qatar. Kingdoms, including Qatar, cover 60 percent of the costs, around $650 million.

The official acknowledgement of the base came in March 2002, when Vice President Dick Cheney stopped there during a trip to the region with a group of reporters. In April 2003, shortly after the start of the U.S.-led invasion of Iraq, the U.S. Combat Air Operations Center for the Middle East moved from Prince Sultan Air Base in Saudi Arabia to what was then a backup headquarters built a year prior in Qatar that was viewed as a more congenial location for basing U.S. troops.

Al Udeid and other facilities in Qatar serve as logistics, command, and basing hubs for the U.S. Central Command (CENTCOM) area of operations, and oversees U.S. air operations in countries, including Iraq, Afghanistan, and Syria.

Royal Air Force 

Between 2004 and 2009 the airbase was used by the Royal Air Force with transport and fast-jet aircraft to support Operation Telic (Iraq War) and Operation Herrick (War in Afghanistan).

These included 6 to 8 Tornado GR4 aircraft drawn from different parts of the Royal Air Force as well as multiple Vickers VC10 from the No. 101 Squadron RAF. British Tornados were equipped with a range of stores, including the Vicon Recce Pod, LITENING targeting pod, 1000 lb HE bombs, Paveway II and Paveway III laser-guided bombs, and the RAPTOR Recce Pod. They were chosen for their currency and up-to-date modification state.

The RAF aircraft were accompanied by nearly 400 personnel, of which approximately 130 were aircraft engineers while the remaining 270 were active in support and operation management roles. Squadron personnel were on a two-month rotation at RAF Al Udeid with the remainder of the force on a four-month rotation. Support personnel were on varying rotations but not as often generally as the squadron personnel. The RAF operated from what was known as the "Southern QRA" buildings. Aircraft were housed in canvas shelters to protect them and the personnel working on them from the heat of the sun.
RAF Al Udeid was used as a staging post for personnel en route to Iraq (in particular, Basrah) with personnel transferring from passenger aircraft, such as the RAF-operated Tristar and VC10, to the tactical transport Lockheed C-130 Hercules. The Hercules transit was in the region of two hours and mostly in tactical black-out conditions.

Royal Australian Air Force

As part of Australia's contribution to coalition forces in the 2003 invasion of Iraq, fourteen F/A-18 Hornet fighters from No. 75 Squadron RAAF were based at Al Udeid, along with two P-3 Orion maritime patrol aircraft and three C-130 Hercules military transport aircraft. During the early phases of the war, the Hornets flew long missions escorting and protecting coalition AWACS Early warning aircraft and tanker aircraft used for air-to-air refueling. Later, when the threat to aircraft was reduced, the Hornets switched to the ground attack and combat support roles and were used to attack Iraqi ground forces with laser-guided bombs. The Orions flew long endurance missions over the Persian Gulf tracking vessels, curbing smuggling and guarding against the threat posed by suicide boats. The deployed Hercules flew supplies and equipment into Iraq, and later flew some of the first humanitarian aid into Baghdad. The fourteen Royal Australian Air Force Hornets flew over 670 sorties during the war, including 350 combat sorties over Iraq.

Following Australia's formal withdraw of forces from Iraq and to upon Afghanistan in 2008, the air bridge for operations in the Middle East was re-located to Al Minhad Air Base in the United Arab Emirates.

Current use

Qatari Air Force

Al Udeid Air Base is the main headquarters for the Qatar Emiri Air Force, although some of its squadrons are based at Doha International Airport.

Royal Air Force

After the withdrawal of British Tornados and VC10s in Summer 2009 to other locations, Royal Air Force activities at Al Udeid were reduced.

Since 2014 it has been used as HQ for British involvement in airstrikes against ISIS in Iraq (Operation Shader).

The Royal Air Force has also stationed an RC-135 Rivet Joint signals intelligence aircraft at the base to operate over Iraq and Syria, although this aircraft has been pictured operating from RAF Akrotiri in Cyprus.

United States Air Force

Military cooperation and foreign assistance 
With its small territory and narrow population base, Qatar relies to a large degree on external cooperation and support for its security. Qatar invested over US$1 billion to construct the Al Udeid airfield during the 1990s; it did not have a large air force of its own at the time. The United States Army Corps of Engineers also awarded over $100 million in Military Construction Air Force (MCAF) contracts for the construction of U.S. storage, housing, service, command, and communication facilities. Qatar's financing and construction of some of the state-of-the-art air force base at Al Udeid and its granting of permission for the construction of U.S.-funded facilities helped deepen cooperation with the United States Department of Defense.

The Al Udeid Air Base now serves as a logistics, command, and basing hub for U.S. operations in Afghanistan and Iraq. Nearby Camp As Sayliyah houses significant U.S. military equipment pre-positioning and command and control facilities for the CENTCOM's area of operations. Both Qatar and the United States have invested in the construction and expansion of these facilities since the mid-1990s, and they form the main hub of the CENTCOM air and ground logistical network in the area of responsibility. As a result of ongoing operations in Iraq and Afghanistan, U.S. and partner nation facilities in Qatar and elsewhere have received higher use in recent years.

In early June 2017, the Pentagon said that the diplomatic rupture and tensions between Qatar and some of its Arab neighbors would not affect U.S. operations at the Air Base.

The air base played an important role during the 2018 missile strikes against Syria, in which two USAF Rockwell B-1B Lancer bombers from the 34th Bomb Squadron flew from the base.

The base stationed F-22 Raptors for the first time in June 2019. A month later, an expansion of the base was announced to be funded by Qatar, which would cost $1.8 billion.

Units 

 United States Marine Corps (USMC) Marine Tactical Electronic Warfare 3 (VMAQ-3) 'Moondogs' from 17 February 2014, with Northrop Grumman EA-6B Prowlers until 9 August 2014.

Congress appropriations and authorizations 
From FY2003 to FY2007, Congress authorized and appropriated $126 million for U.S. military construction activities in Qatar.

The National Defense Authorization Act for Fiscal Year 2008 (P.L. 110-181) authorized $81.7 million in FY2008 spending to build new Air Force and Special Operations facilities in Qatar.

The National Defense Authorization Act for Fiscal Year 2009 (P.L. 110-417) authorized $69.6 million in FY2009 spending to build new Air Force and Special Operations facilities.

The National Defense Authorization Act for Fiscal Year 2010 (P.L. 111-84) authorized $117 million in FY2010 spending to build new Air Force recreational, dormitory, and other facilities at Al Udeid.

The Administration's FY2011 military construction request for Qatar was $64.3 million, for Air Force facilities and a National Security Agency warehouse.

The FY2012 request included $37 million to continue the dormitory and recreation facility project.

References

External links 

 
 
 
 
 
 

Airports in Qatar
Military installations of the United States in Qatar
Royal Air Force stations in the Middle East
Qatar–United Kingdom military relations
Military installations established in the 1990s
Military installations of the United Kingdom in other countries